Tungku Highway(formerly known as Tungku Link Road or Tungku Link) is a major highway in Brunei-Muara District, Brunei.

History

On 14 May 2011, the Minister of Development, Pehin Orang Kaya Indera Pahlawan Dato Seri Setia Awang Haji Suyoi Haji Osman, launched 11 new road names. One of them is the former Tungku Link Road which has been upgraded to a highway status and renamed as Tungku Highway.

Junction list

Intersection names are conjectural and unofficial.

 I/C - interchange, I/S - intersection

References 

Roads and Highways in Brunei